Blush is a village in the Korçë County, southeastern Albania. At the 2015 local government reform it became part of the municipality Kolonjë.

Notable people

References 

Populated places in Kolonjë, Korçë
Villages in Korçë County